A millisecond (from milli- and second; symbol: ms) is a unit of time in the International System of Units (SI) equal to one thousandth (0.001 or 10−3 or 1/1000) of a second and to 1000 microseconds.

A unit of 10 milliseconds may be called a centisecond, and one of 100 milliseconds a decisecond, but these names are rarely used.
To help compare orders of magnitude of different times, this page lists times between 10−3 seconds and 100 seconds (1 millisecond and one second). See also times of other orders of magnitude.

Examples
The Apollo Guidance Computer used metric units internally, with centiseconds used for time calculation and measurement.

1 millisecond (1 ms) – cycle time for frequency 1 kHz; duration of light for typical photo flash strobe; time taken for sound wave to travel about 34 cm; repetition interval of GPS C/A PN code
1 millisecond - time taken for light to travel 204.19 km in a single mode fiber optic cable for a wavelength of 1550nm (frequency : 193 THz).
1.000692286 milliseconds – time taken for light to travel 300 km in a vacuum
1 to 5 milliseconds – typical response time in LCD computer monitors, especially high-end displays
2 milliseconds – Shift time for a modern Formula One car using a seamless-shift semi-automatic sequential transmission
2.27 milliseconds – cycle time for pitch A440, the most commonly used pitch for tuning musical instruments
3 milliseconds – a housefly's wing flap. Also the normative speed of sound (an issue in track and field)
3.3 milliseconds – normal delay time between initiation and detonation of a C4 explosive charge
4 milliseconds – typical average seek time for a 10,000 rpm hard disk
5 milliseconds – a honey bee's wing flap
5 milliseconds to 80 milliseconds – a hummingbird's wing flap
8 milliseconds – 1/125 of a second, a standard camera shutter speed (125); fastest shifting time of a car's mechanical transmission
10 milliseconds (10 ms) – a jiffy, cycle time for frequency 100 Hz
10.378 milliseconds – rotation period of pulsar B1639+36A
15.625 milliseconds – a two hundred fifty-sixth note at 60 BPM
16.67 milliseconds (1/60 second) – a third, cycle time for American 60 Hz AC electricity (mains grid)
16.68 milliseconds (1/59.94 second) – the amount of time one field lasts in 29.97 fps interlaced video (commonly erroneously referred to as 30 fps)
20 milliseconds – cycle time for European 50 Hz AC electricity
31.25 milliseconds – a hundred twenty-eighth note at 60 BPM
33.367 milliseconds – the amount of time one frame lasts in 29.97 fps video (most common for NTSC-legacy formats)
41.667 milliseconds – the amount of time one frame lasts in 24 fps video (most common cinematic frame rate)
41.708 milliseconds – the amount of time one frame lasts in 23.976 fps video (cinematic frame rate for NTSC-legacy formats)
50 milliseconds – the time interval between gear changes on a Lamborghini Aventador; with a 7-speed single-clutch automated manual transmission
50 milliseconds – cycle time for the lowest audible tone, 20 Hz
60 milliseconds – cycle time for European 16.7 Hz AC electrified railroad power grid
60 milliseconds – the time interval between gear changes on a Ferrari 458 Spider; with a 7-speed dual-clutch automatic transmission
62.5 milliseconds – a sixty-fourth note at 60 BPM
5 to 80 milliseconds – typical latency for a broadband internet connection (important for playing online games)
100 milliseconds – the time interval between gear changes on a Ferrari FXX; with a 6-speed single-clutch automated manual transmission
125 milliseconds – a thirty-second note at 60 BPM
134 milliseconds – time taken by light to travel around the Earth's equator
150 milliseconds – recommended maximum time delay for telephone service
100 - 400 milliseconds – the time for the human eye to blink
185 milliseconds – the duration of a full rotation of the main rotor on Bell 205, 212, and 412 helicopters (normal rotor speed is 324 RPM)
200 milliseconds – the time it takes the human brain to recognize emotion in facial expressions
250 milliseconds – a sixteenth note at 60 BPM
400 milliseconds – time in which the fastest baseball pitches reach the strike zone
430 to 500 milliseconds – common modern dance music tempos (120–140 BPM)
495 milliseconds – an approximate average of the round trip time for communications via geosynchronous satellites
500 milliseconds – an eighth note at 60 BPM
770 milliseconds – revolution period of a 78 rpm record
860 milliseconds – average human resting heart cycle time
1000 milliseconds – one second; the period of a 1 Hz oscillator
86,400,000 (24 × 60 × 60 × 1000) milliseconds – one day
604,800,000 (24 × 60 × 60 × 1000 × 7) milliseconds – one week
31,556,925,974.7 (86,400,000 × approximately 365.242) milliseconds – one year

See also
 International System of Units
 Second
 Microsecond
 Nanosecond
 Picosecond
 Femtosecond
 Attosecond
 Orders of magnitude (time)

References

External links 

 The National Institute of Standards and Technology (NIST)

Orders of magnitude (time)

de:Sekunde#Abgeleitete Maßeinheiten